Great Songs from Stage & Screen is the sixth studio album by American actor and singer Seth MacFarlane, released on August 28, 2020, by Republic Records and Verve Records. As the executive producer, MacFarlane reunited with his longtime producers Joel McNeely and Joy Fehily. The album features songs from film and theatre, including songs by Rodgers and Hammerstein, Cole Porter, Lerner and Loewe, and Henry Mancini.

Background
On August 9, 2020, MacFarlane teased on his Instagram that a sixth album was coming soon. It was later announced that MacFarlane would release his new album at the end of the month. He recorded a majority of the songs at Abbey Road Studios. However, much of the album's post-production work was done at home due to the ongoing COVID-19 pandemic. MacFarlane described the songs as having been soothing the souls through the decades, saying, "Great songwriting presented with great orchestration is always uplifting. Hopefully these tunes offer, if nothing else, a little mood boost during a dark time." He explained his decision on picking the songs as, "It's just a selection of songs that I wish would be sung more. So you know, instead of 'Oklahoma' by Rodgers and Hammerstein, we do 'All Er Nuthin'.'" He called the album's tone more light than his previous album. He would describe it as more of a repertoire style record. MacFarlane collaborated with composer Bruce Broughton, who he works with on The Orville, to arrange and conduct the album. In explaining his decision on bringing Broughton on board, MacFarlane said, "The album is masterfully arranged by composer Bruce Broughton, whose signature vibrance and sophisticated orchestral texturing is a perfect match for this collection of show-centric swing arrangements and ballads." In addition, MacFarlane brought in members of the John Wilson Orchestra.

Critical reception

Great Songs from Stage & Screen received mostly positive reviews from music critics. AllMusic's Stephen Thomas Erlewine wrote "Six albums into his recording career, Seth MacFarlane lands upon an idea to demonstrate his extensive knowledge and love of the Great American Songbook. Instead of concentrating on the standards he and his audience know by heart, he's digging a little deeper into the catalog, using musicals as his divining rod. It's a good idea, and with the help of longtime producer Joel McNeely and arranger Bruce Broughton, MacFarlane sounds at ease in a way he hasn't on record in the past. He's still leaning on his love of Sinatra, but he's reined in some of his affectations, a move that's as welcome as the largely offbeat selections here. When combined, it amounts to a handsome collection that serves as a testament to MacFarlane's good taste in vocal pop." Francine Brokaw from Family Choice Awards praised the album, writing, "Listening to his recordings I have decided that even though I have enjoyed Seth MacFarlane in his other roles, I really love his singing the most. Although his acting/writing/producing is pretty good too! His recordings are delightful and rich. I do have some favorite tracks on this CD however all of the songs are delightful. There are several ballads as well as a few upbeat tunes. The collection is the perfect blend of songs personally selected by MacFarlane." She continued to write, "Seth MacFarlane is among my top male vocalists and with this new release he has moved up many notches. The bottom line is this is a fantastic collection of songs sung by a great singer. This is his sixth studio album and definitely a treasure." Deanna Costa from The Arts Fuse lauded MacFarlane's cover of "Once Upon a Dream", saying it's "filled with happy nostalgia" and did "wonderful justice to this Disney classic."

Track listing

Personnel 
Credits adapted from AllMusic.

 Jonathan Aasgaard – Cello
John Anderson – Oboe
John Barrett – Assistant Engineer
Chuck Berghofer – Bass
Irving Berlin – Composer
Anna-Liisa Bezrodny – Violin
Adrian Bradbury – Cello
Rich Breen – Engineer, Mixing
Bruce Broughton – Arranger, conductor
Benjamin Buckton – Violin
Sammy Cahn – Composer
Gordon Campbell – Trombone
Rebecca Chambers – Viola
Corinne Chappelle – Violin
Stephano Civetta – Assistant Engineer
Dave Collins – Mastering
Betty Comden – Composer
Kris Crawford – Assistant Engineer
Tom Croxon – Orchestra Contractor
Hannah Dawson – Violin
Rudi DeGroote – Cello
Shlomy Dobrinsky – Violin
Kira Doherty – French Horn
Pierre Doumenge – Cello
Dream Town Orchestra – Orchestration
Clare Duckworth – Violin
Michael Edwards – Composer
Peter Erskine – Drums
Joy Fehily – Executive Producer
Carl Fischer – Composer
Sammy Gallop – Composer
Ian Gibbs – Violin
Tim Gibbs – Bass
Thomas Goodman – Bass
Mark Graham – Music Preparation
Peter Graham – Violin
Adolph Green – Composer
Bud Green – Composer
Thelma Handy – Violin
Philip Harmer – Oboe
Lorenz Hart – Composer
Andrew Harvey – Violin
Richard Harwood – Cello
Oliver Heath – Violin
Cormac Henry – Flute
Dan Higgins – Clarinet, Sax (Alto)
Jeremy Isaac – Violin
Maya Iwabuchi – Violin
Paul James – Composer
Magnus Johnston – Violin
Cerys Jones – Violin
Francis Kefford – Viola
Liam Kirkman – Trombone
Larry Koonse – Guitars
Nicholas Korth – French Horn
Frankie Laine – Composer
Dunja Lavrova – Violin
Peggy Lee – Composer
Mike Lovatt – Trumpet
James Lynch – Trumpet
Seth MacFarlane – Art Direction, Liner Notes, Primary Artist, Producer, Vocals
Ciaran McCabe – Violin
Joel McNeely – Producer
Johnny Mercer – Composer
John Mills – Violin
Kate Musker – Viola
Alex Neal – Percussion
Benjamin Newton – Viola
Peter North – Trombone
Simon Oliver – Bass
John Parricelli – Guitars
Fiona Paterson – Flute
Julie Pryce – Bassoon
Matthew Quenby – Viola
Tom Ranier – Piano
Edward C. Redding – Composer
Richard Rodgers – Composer
Ruth Rogers – Violin
Ben Rogerson – Cello
Laura Samuel – Violin
Victor Schertzinger – Composer
Bill Sienkiewicz – Illustrations
Kristen Sorace – Design
Lew Spence – Composer
Joe Spix – Art Direction
Jill Streater – Librarian
Jule Styne – Composer
Kay Swift – Composer
Laurence Ungless – Bass
Sam Walton – Percussion
Vicci Wardman – Viola
Hugh Webb – Harp
Natalie Weber – A&R
Claire Webster – Bassoon
Hubie Wheeler – Composer
Michael Whight – Clarinet
Pat White – Trumpet
Alec Wilder – Composer
Steven Wilkie – Violin

Release history

References

External links

2020 albums
Albums produced by Joel McNeely
Big band albums
Covers albums
Easy listening albums
Jazz albums by American artists
Swing albums
Seth MacFarlane albums
Republic Records albums
Verve Records albums